Bromus inermis is a species of the true grass family (Poaceae). This rhizomatous grass is native to Europe and North America.

It starts growth in early spring; flowers May to July; reproduces from seeds, tillers, and rhizomes. It may regrow and re flower in the fall if moisture is sufficient.

Common names

Bromus inermis subsp. inermis
 Austrian bromegrass  – English
 awnless brome – English
 Hungarian brome – English
 Hungarian bromegrass – English
 Russian bromegrass  – English
 smooth brome – English
 smooth bromegrass – English
 brome inerme – French
 brome sans arêtes – French
 unbegrannte Trespe – German
 wehrlose Trespe – German
 capim-cevadilha – Portuguese
 bromo de Hungría – Spanish
 bromo inerme – Spanish

Bromus inermis subsp. pumpellianus
 Arctic brome – English
 Pumpelly's brome – English

References

 GBIF entry: Bromus inermis

External links
 Bromus inermis Photos, drawings, description from Nature Manitoba
 

inermis
Flora of Europe
Flora of North America
Bunchgrasses of Europe
Bunchgrasses of North America